Benz[a]anthracene or benzo[a]anthracene is a polycyclic aromatic hydrocarbon with the chemical formula C18H12. It is produced during incomplete combustion of organic matter.

Benz[a]anthracene is one of carcinogenic constituents of tobacco smoke.

See also
 Tetracene, also known as benz[b]anthracene

References

External links
 Toxic Substances Portal - Polycyclic Aromatic Hydrocarbons A resource summarizing many toxicological aspects of benzanthracene and other polycyclic aromatic hydrocarbons.

Polycyclic aromatic hydrocarbons
IARC Group 2A carcinogens
Tetracyclic compounds
PBT substances